Joseph's Tunic is a 1630 painting by Diego Velázquez, now held in the museum of the Sacristía Mayor del Monasterio de San Lorenzo de El Escorial (Madrid, Spain). It was painted in the house of the Spanish ambassador in Rome and brought back to Spain with the painting Apollo in the Forge of Vulcan.

See also
 Coat of many colors

External links
Velázquez, exhibition catalog from The Metropolitan Museum of Art (fully available online as PDF), which contains material on this painting (see index)

Religious paintings by Diego Velázquez
1630 paintings
Paintings depicting Jacob
Dogs in art
Paintings in the collection of El Escorial